Rwanda national basketball team is a basketball team that represents Rwanda in international competitions. It is administered by the Rwandan Basketball Federation (FERWABA)

Before 2000, Team Rwanda was virtually unknown to most basketball fans worldwide. Since the mid-2000s however, the team slowly but surely has made a name for itself. Team Rwanda has emerged as a major force in East Africa and has qualified for the AfroBasket, Africa's prime basketball event, four times in a row.

At the AfroBasket 2021 on home soil, Rwanda beat Angola, winner of 10 AfroBasket editions between 1989 and 2013. 
Rwanda's Alex Mpoyo stated: 

It is good to see that our work to best represent our country is appreciated so much. Honestly, I cannot thank enough the thousands of fans who came to cheer us on, with their songs and dances throughout the game, even when we were behind. Their unconditional support has been a tremendous source of motivation for us.

Competitive record

AfroBasket

African Games

Team

Current roster
Roster for the AfroBasket 2021.

Depth chart

Head coach position
 Većeslav Kavedžija – 2007–2011
 Moise Mutokambali – 2012–2013, 2014–2017
 Cheikh Sarr – 2021–present

Past rosters
Team for the 2013 FIBA Africa Championship.

At AfroBasket 2015 qualification:

Kit

Manufacturer
2013 – Nike

2017–present Erreà

See also
Rwanda national under-19 basketball team
Rwanda national under-17 basketball team
Rwanda women's national basketball team
Rwanda national 3x3 team

References

External links
FIBA profile
Africabasket – Rwanda Men National Team
Archived records of Rwanda team participations

Videos
#AfroBasket – Day 2: Rwanda v Burkina Faso (highlights) Youtube.com video

 
Men's national basketball teams
1977 establishments in Rwanda